Only Human is the fourth album released by the Florida-based hard rock music group, Crease. This album was released in 2004, via Whateverman Records.

Track listing
 "Nothing Is Real"  – 3:28
 "Live To Be In Love"  – 4:59
 "Wrapped Around You"  – 4:29
 "Transparent" – 3:51
 "Indifferent"  – 4:15
 "Whipped"  – 3:52
 "Ordinary"  – 3:50
 "Obviously"  – 3:11
 "Just Like Me"  – 3:35
 "Weight Of The World"  – 2:57
 "Make Me Believe"  – 3:54
 "Too Late For Love"  – 4:41

Personnel
Crease:
Kelly Meister - lead vocals
Fritz Dorigo - guitars, vocals
Greg Gershengorn - bass, vocals
Eric Dorigo - drums, percussion

Addition Personal:
Greg Wiktorski - keyboards, programming
Chris Crane - keyboards, programming
Paul Pettitt - keyboards

Production
Charles Dye – producer, mixer, engineer
Greg Gershengorn - producer, engineer
Richard Serotta - engineer
Crease - producer
Paul Trust - producer, engineer

References

External links 
Artistdirect.com

2004 albums